Winchester Guildhall is a municipal building in the High Street, Winchester, Hampshire. It is a Grade II listed building.

History
The site was previously occupied by St Mary's Abbey and came under crown control on the dissolution of the monasteries in the late 1530s: it was then gifted by Queen Mary to the City of Salisbury in gratitude for the city's support in securing her marriage to King Philip of Spain in 1554.

The foundation stone was laid by the former Speaker of the House of Commons, Viscount Eversley on 22 December 1871. The new building was designed by Jeffery and Skiller in the Gothic Revival style and built by Joseph Bull & Sons. The design for the central section involved a flight of steps leading up to an arcaded entrance on the first floor, three mullion windows on the second floor with a tall clock tower above flanked by angle pavilions. Statues of local historical figures were erected on the front of the building at second floor level. It was officially opened by the Lord Chancellor, Earl of Selborne, on 18 May 1873.

An extension to the west of the original building, built to the designs of John Colson with a flint-work frontage, thereby creating a new banqueting facility, was added in 1893. The banqueting facility was subsequently renamed the King Charles Room. The guildhall, which was the meeting place of the municipal borough of Winchester continued to serve as the local seat of government after the enlarged City of Winchester was formed in 1974.

In June 2009, a large room in the guildhall was extensively refurbished with financial support from a legacy left by the Marchioness of Winchester; the money had been left on condition that it would be used to build a public hall in her honour, complete with a full-length portrait of her. In accordance with her wishes, the room was renamed the Bapsy Room in her honour and a huge portrait of her in her state robes by Frank Salisbury was given pride of place in the room.

When a portrait of King Charles I, hanging in the King Charles Room, was restored in 2017, it was revealed that the portrait was originally a depiction of Henry Jermyn, 1st Earl of St Albans by Peter Lely which had been over-painted by another painter with an image of the King. Other paintings in the King Charles Room include a portrait of King Charles II, also by Peter Lely, and a portrait of Queen Elizabeth II by Edward Halliday. In the stairwell there is a painting of the children of Charles Paulet, 13th Marquess of Winchester by Thomas Stewardson.

References

Grade II listed buildings in Hampshire
City and town halls in Hampshire
Government buildings completed in 1875